HMS Adventure was a barque that the Royal Navy purchased in 1771. She had been the merchant vessel Marquis of Rockingham, launched in 1770 at Whitby. In naval service she sailed with Resolution on James Cook's second expedition to the Pacific in 1772–1775. She was the first ship to circumnavigate the globe from west to east. After her return she served as a store ship until 1779. The navy sold her in 1783 and she resumed a civilian career, but retaining the name Adventure. She was lost in May 1811.

Career
She began her career as the North Sea collier Marquis of Rockingham, launched at Whitby in 1770.

Soon after his return from his first voyage in 1771, Commander Cook was commissioned by the Royal Society of London to make a second voyage in search of a supposed southern continent, Terra Australis Incognita. He arranged for the Navy to purchase two ships, the second and smaller of which was Marquis of Rockingham.

The Navy purchased her in 1771 and first named her Raleigh or Rayleigh, and then Adventure. The Navy commissioned her under Joseph Shank.

Cook was given the command of Resolution, with Commander Tobias Furneaux accompanying him in Adventure, having replaced Shank.

Resolution and Adventure left Plymouth on 13 July 1772 and on 17 January 1773 were the first European ships to cross the Antarctic Circle. On 8 February 1773 the two ships became separated in a fog and Furneaux directed Adventure towards the prearranged meeting point of Queen Charlotte Sound (New Zealand), charted by Cook in 1770.

On the way to the rendezvous, Adventure surveyed the southern and eastern coasts of Tasmania (then known as Van Diemen's Land), where Adventure Bay was named for the ship. Furneaux made the earliest British chart of this shore, but as he did not enter Bass Strait he assumed Tasmania to be part of Australia. Most of his names here survive; Cook, visiting this shore-line on his third voyage, confirmed Furneaux's account and delineation of it, and named after him the islands in Banks Strait.

Adventure arrived at Queen Charlotte Sound on 7 May 1773 and Resolution followed on 17 May. From June to October the two ships explored the southern Pacific, reaching Tahiti on 15 August, where Omai of Ra'iatea embarked on Adventure (Omai later became the first Pacific Islander to visit Europe before returning to Tahiti with Cook in 1776). After calling at Tonga in the Friendly Islands the ships returned to New Zealand but were separated by a storm on 22 October. This time the rendezvous at Queen Charlotte Sound was missed — Resolution departed on 26 November, four days before Adventure arrived. Cook had left a message buried in the sand setting out his plan to explore the South Pacific and return to New Zealand. Furneaux decided to return home and buried a reply to that effect.

Before he could leave, a fight broke out between Adventure's crew and the local Māori people, in which ten crewmen and two Māoris were killed. This was reportedly prompted by an unknowing breach of tapu by a sailor, who placed a tin can that had held food on a chief's head. Alternatively, it may have been due to a barter gone wrong at Grass Cove on 17 Dec. 1773, and Kahura taking revenge (utu).
Adventure set out for home on 22 December 1773 via Cape Horn, She returned to England on 14 July 1774 and entered the double dock in the Royal Dockyard at Deptford where between March and May 1775 she was converted into a store ship for Halifax, Canada.

Lieutenant John Hallum recommissioned Adventure in March 1775. He sailed for North America on 26 June 1775. In November 1777 Lieutenant Hugh Tolken replaced Hallum at Boston. Between January and March 1779 she underwent refitting at Deptford Dockyard.
 
The log for 5 September 1779 shows that "this day 8 men deserted the ship. Ditto took two of them again by information and confined them in irons".

Adventure set sail from Halifax on 26 October 1779, in company with the ships Keppel, Royal Briton and Dunmore. She sailed mainly in fresh or hard gales for most of the 36 days it took to reach Spithead, which is situated at the eastern part of the channel between Hampshire, England, and the Isle of Wight at Portsmouth. The voyage was not without its tensions. The log records that on 6 December 1779, the Captain "punished William Pritt with two dozen lashes for striking the boatswain and carpenter". Adventure arrived at Sheerness in December 1779, and was paid off on 13 January 1780. She underwent fitting as a fireship, but was never employed in that role.

Adventure was laid up at Sheerness until the Navy sold her on 7 May 1783 for £900, apparently to her original owners.

Merchantman
In 1784 an Adventure, of 350 tons (bm), British-built, entered Lloyd's Register (LR). Her trade was London-Davis Strait, signalling that she was a whaler in the northern whale fishery.

She was last listed in 1794.

Adventure reappeared in Lloyd's Register (LR) in 1800 with H. Lisk, master, T.Brown, owner, and trade London transport.

Fate
On 24 May 1811, Adventure, Snowden, master, was sailing between Leith and Quebec when she was wrecked in the Saint Lawrence River. All her crew were saved.

Citations

References
 
 
 Lincoln Paxton Paine, Ships of the World: An Historical Encyclopedia, Houghton Mifflin, 1997.
 Gibson, Doug (1978) "The Adventure", in Cook's Log 3/3
 Lieutenant's logbook for HMS Robust 1778 – 1779; National Maritime Museum, Greenwich; ADM/L/R/165 1778 
Masters' Logs, Store ship Adventure; The National Archives, Kew; ADM 52/1534
 http://collections.nmm.ac.uk/collections/objects/85203.html

External links
 
 Digitised copies of the original log of HMS Adventure by Commander T Furneaux, British Atmospheric Data Centre/The National Archives as part of the CORRAL project

 

Exploration ships of the United Kingdom
Ships of the Royal Navy
Shipwrecks of the Saint Lawrence River
HMS Adventure
1770 ships
Ships built in Whitby
Age of Discovery ships
Maritime incidents in 1811